Il trionfo dell'onore (The Triumph of Honour) is an operatic 'commedia' in three acts by the Italian composer Alessandro Scarlatti, with a libretto by . It was first performed at the Teatro dei Fiorentini, Naples, on 26 November 1718. It is Scarlatti's only known comic opera.

Roles

Synopsis
Act 1
Ricardo Albenori, a dissolute young man, and his friend, the soldier Rodimarte Bombarda, arrive in Pisa, having escaped from Lucca where they had run into trouble with the law. In Lucca, Riccardo had also seduced Leonora Dorini before rejecting her in favour of Doralice Rossetti. Leonora has followed him and takes refuge with Cornelia Buffacci, Doralice's aunt. Doralice, too, is still pursuing Riccardo, who manages to convince her he loves her.

Act 2
Erminio, Leonora's brother who is in love with Doralice, arrives in Pisa. Leonora tells him how Riccardo, Erminio's friend, seduced her. He vows to avenge her. Leonora and Doralice quarrel over Riccardo.

Act 3
Riccardo plans to elope with Doralice but Erminio finds him and challenges him to a duel. Riccardo is wounded, repents his dissolute life and accepts Leonora's hand in marriage.

References

Further reading
 The Viking Opera Guide, ed. Amanda Holden (Viking, 1993)
 Work details, Magazine de l'opéra baroque (in French)]

Operas by Alessandro Scarlatti
Italian-language operas
1718 operas
Operas